Billy Joe Rish (September 10, 1932 – May 17, 2008) was an American politician. He served as a Democratic member for the 8th and 9th district of the Florida House of Representatives.

Life and career 
Rish was born in Wewahitchka, Florida, the son of Lucy and Roy P. Rish. He attended Wewahitchka High School, the University of Florida and the University of Florida Levin College of Law.

In 1970, Rish was elected to represent the 8th district of the Florida House of Representatives, succeeding John Robert Middlemas. He served until 1972, when he was succeeded by Earl Hutto. In the same year, he was elected to represent the 9th district, succeeding Joe Chapman. He served until 1978, when he was succeeded by Leonard J. Hall.

Rish died in May 2008, at the age of 75.

References 

1932 births
2008 deaths
People from Wewahitchka, Florida
Democratic Party members of the Florida House of Representatives
20th-century American politicians
University of Florida alumni
Fredric G. Levin College of Law alumni